The Women's 400 metres hurdles event at the 2011 World Championships in Athletics was held at the Daegu Stadium on August 29, 30 and September 1.

Kaliese Spencer had the fastest time of the year before the competition and led in the Diamond League rankings. Fellow Jamaican Melaine Walker (the reigning world and Olympic champion) was also present, as was Lashinda Demus, the runner-up in 2009. Czech athlete Zuzana Hejnová was the second fastest entrant and was second in the rankings in the Diamond League. The three medallists from the 2010 European Championships – Natalya Antyukh, Vania Stambolova, and Perri Shakes-Drayton – were the other athletes in contention for a medal.

Lashinda Demus in lane 3, broke quickly from the start, quickly making up the stagger on lane 4 Zuzana Hejnová.  In lane 8, defending champion Melaine Walker was also out fast.  Demus maintained her advantage as Kaliese Spencer made a run at her, but Spencer faltered.  The stretch run was the top two finishers from the previous championship, but the medals were reversed as Demus set a new National Record for the United States and the number three all time mark in the event.

Medalists

Records

Qualification standards

Schedule

Results

Heats
Qualification: First 4 in each heat (Q) and the next 4 fastest (q) advance to the semifinals.

Semifinals
Qualification: First 2 in each heat (Q) and the next 2 fastest (q) advance to the final.

Final

References

External links
400 metres hurdles results at IAAF website

Hurdles 400
400 metres hurdles at the World Athletics Championships
2011 in women's athletics